Adjungbilly is a rural community in the central east part of the Riverina and on the north-western edge of the Snowy Mountains.  It is situated about 29 kilometres south-east of Gobarralong and 35 kilometres north-east of Tumut.

The (first) Tomooroma Post Office opened on 15 May 1896, was renamed Adjungbilly in 1899 and closed in 1974.

The area of Adjungbilly was originally referred to as Nadjongbilla, from the Wiradjuri word nadjong meaning water and billa meaning creek, therefore referring to the area's creek with its permanent water supply.

The area has a community hall and a small isolated primary school named the Bongongo Public School probably in relation to the nearby Bongongo Station.

Climate

Owing to Adjingbilly's location in between the western plains of New South Wales and the dividing range, it varies greatly in maximum temperatures between seasons with a distinct winter rainfall peak. Falls of snow are by no means uncommon.

Notes and references

Towns in the Riverina
Towns in New South Wales
Parishes of Buccleuch County
Localities in New South Wales
Geography of New South Wales